The Coveș is a right tributary of the river Hârtibaciu in Romania. It discharges into the Hârtibaciu near Agnita.

References

See also
 Protected areas of Romania

Rivers of Romania
Rivers of Sibiu County
Nature reserves in Romania